Statistics of Primera Fuerza in season 1909-10.

Overview
In three fourths of all matches in Mexico’s 1909/10 championship season, one (if not both) sides failed to score. Reforma Athletic Club went unbeaten again and successfully defended their title. Only two players remained of the side which had won in 1909, Charles Butlin and Robert Blackmore. The latter, a win half-back, even finished top scorer. English trainer "Tom" Phillips had built a new team and led them right on to victory.

League standings

Top goalscorers
Players sorted first by goals scored, then by last name.

References
Mexico - List of final tables (RSSSF)

1909-10
Mex
1909–10 in Mexican football